Hendy is a surname. Notable people with the surname include:

Andrew Hendy
Arnold Francis Hendy, architect
Arthur Hendy
George William Albert Hendy
Jim Hendy
John Hendy (disambiguation)
Peter Hendy
Peter Hendy (politician)
Philip Hendy
Trevor Hendy